Draconian is a Swedish gothic/doom metal band formed in Säffle in 1994.

History

Formation and demos (1994–2002 )
Draconian was formed in 1994 in Säffle, Sweden. In May 1994, drummer and vocalist Johan Ericson, bassist and vocalist Jesper Stolpe and guitarist Andy Hindenäs assembled the band Kerberos, initially playing melodic death metal with black metal influences. Seven months later, lead vocalist and lyrics composer Anders Jacobsson joined the band, and its name changed to Draconian.

Their first demo, Shades of a Lost Moon, was recorded in 1995. Guests were flutist and vocalist Jessica Eriksson, keyboardist and vocalist Susanne Arvidsson, and Andreas Haag on the introductory section of “My Nemesis”. It was released in February, 1996, however, no recording contract was obtained. In early 1997, the band proceeded to record their second demo, entitled In Glorious Victory. The band, however, became discontent with the quality of the recording and discontinued the release.

In the following months, two members of Draconian had to complete their military service, slowing down the progress of the band. Susanne Arvidsson left the band due to personal reasons and was replaced in 2001 by Lisa Johansson.

Both in 1998 and 1999, the band did some gigs. After receiving positive reactions, they decided to enter the studio once more. In August 1999, Draconian recorded The Closed Eyes of Paradise, an album dealing mostly with the theme of Lucifer and his fallen angels. Susanne Arvidsson made guest vocal appearances on this release. Between May and June 2000, Andreas Karlsson, Anders Jacobsson, and Johan Ericson worked on the mix, and the demo was released in the face of further line-up changes – Andy Hindenäs left the band, replaced by Johan Ericson who switched to guitars; drums were then left to Jerry Torstensson.

The demo Dark Oceans We Cry was recorded in 2002, the first release to feature Lisa Johansson's vocals. The demo was made available on the internet, as well as in CD format. It received good reviews and the band signed a long-awaited record deal with Napalm Records.

Where Lovers Mourn (2003) 

The band recorded their debut album, Where Lovers Mourn in Studio Mega under the supervision of Chris Silver (former member of Sundown and Cemetery) in July 2003. The album was released October 20th, 2003.

Arcane Rain Fell (2004–2005) 
In September 2004, under the direction of Pelle Saether, Draconian entered Studio Underground in Västerås to record their second studio album, Arcane Rain Fell. The album was released January 24, 2005.

The Burning Halo (2006) 
In 2006 they began working on their third release. However, due to myriad fan requests, the band decided to first deliver a bonus album to include remakes of old tracks from The Closed Eyes of Paradise demo. The Burning Halo would also include three new tracks and two covers. Plagued by numerous problems throughout the production phases, the album was delayed and finally completed in June and released September 29th, 2006.

Turning Season Within (2007–2008) 
In September 2007, Draconian started to record their fourth album, Turning Season Within, at the Fascination Street Studios in Örebro with producers Jens Bogren and David Castillo (Opeth, Katatonia). The album was released February 29, 2008.

A Rose for the Apocalypse (2011–2012) 
On June 24, 2011, Draconian released their fifth album A Rose for the Apocalypse. On June 25, 2011, the band released an official music video from the album A Rose for the Apocalypse for the song "The Last Hour of Ancient Sunlight."

On November 15, 2011, vocalist Lisa Johansson left the band due to personal reasons, mainly spending time home with her family.

On September 19, 2012, the band officially announced their new vocalist, Heike Langhans, from South Africa.

Sovran (2015–2016) 
On October 30, 2015, Sovran, the band's sixth studio album, was released via Napalm Records. Sovran is the first album of Draconian with Heike Langhans, who also co-wrote some of the lyrics.

On February 10, 2016, the band announced on its Facebook page that bassist Fredrik Johansson was leaving the band to spend more time with his family and due to his inability to tour with the band. Daniel Änghede, who provided clean vocals on the song "Rivers Between Us" on Sovran, became his replacement.

Under a Godless Veil (2020–present) 
On October 30th 2020, Draconian released their seventh studio album, Under a Godless Veil.

On April 26th 2022, Draconian announced that Niklas Nord had joined the band on rhythm guitar, and that longtime rhythm guitarist Daniel Arvidsson would switch to bass.

On May 3rd, 2022, Draconian announced that vocalist Heike Langhans would leave the band to focus on her family and her own projects, and that former vocalist Lisa Johansson would rejoin the band.

Members 

Current
 Anders Jacobsson – harsh vocals (1994–present), keyboards (1994–2000)
 Johan Ericson – lead guitar (2002–present), drums (1994–2000, 2000–2002)
 Lisa Johansson – clean vocals (2002–2011, 2022–present) 
 Jerry Torstensson – drums (2002–present)
 Daniel Arvidsson – bass (2022–present), rhythm guitar (2005–2022)
 Niklas Nord – rhythm guitar (2022–present)

Former members

 Heike Langhans – clean vocals (2012–2022)
 Daniel Änghede – backing vocals (session member 2015), bass (2016–2020)
 Fredrik Johansson – bass (2006–2016)
 Andreas Karlsson – keyboards, programming (2000–2005; session member 2005–2008)
 Andreas Hindenäs – guitar (1994–1997), lead guitar (1994–2002)
 Magnus Bergström – rhythm guitar (1997–2005)
 Jesper Stolpe – bass (1994–2002, 2004–2005)
 Thomas Jäger –  bass (2002–2004)
 Susanne Arvidsson – keyboards, programming (1995–1997), vocals (session member 2000)

 Former session musicians
 Jessica Eriksson – clean vocals (1995)
 Sanne Carlsson – keyboards (2005–2006)
 Elena Andersson – keyboards (2006–2007)
 Lisa Cuthbert – clean vocals (2015; 2016; 2017)
 Tarald Lie – drums (2016)

Timeline

Discography

Studio albums 
 Where Lovers Mourn (2003)
 Arcane Rain Fell (2005)
 The Burning Halo (2006)
 Turning Season Within (2008)
 A Rose for the Apocalypse (2011)
 Sovran (2015)
 Under a Godless Veil (2020)

Singles 
 "No Greater Sorrow" (Digital download, 2008)
 "The Last Hour of Ancient Sunlight" (2011)
 "Demon You / Lily Anne" (Twenty Years in Tears – A Tribute to Lake of Tears, 2012)
 "Stellar Tombs" (2015)
 "Rivers Between Us" (featuring Daniel Änghede, 2015)
 "Lustrous Heart" (2020)
 "Sorrow of Sophia" (2020)

Demo albums 
 Shades of a Lost Moon (1996)
 In Glorious Victory (1997)
 The Closed Eyes of Paradise (1999)
 Frozen Features (2000)
 Dark Oceans We Cry (2002)

Music videos 
 "The Last Hour of Ancient Sunlight" (2011)
 "Stellar Tombs" (2016)
 "Sleepwalkers" (2020)

Lyric videos 
 "Rivers Between Us" (2015)
 "Lustrous Heart" (2020)
 "Sorrow Of Sophia (2020)
 "The Sacrificial Flame (2020)
 "Moon Over Sabaoth (2020)

References

External links 
 

Swedish death metal musical groups
Swedish gothic metal musical groups
Swedish doom metal musical groups
Musical groups established in 1994
Napalm Records artists
1994 establishments in Sweden